Guruve is a village and centre of Guruve District, Zimbabwe.

References

Populated places in Mashonaland Central Province